Streptomyces ambofaciens is a bacterium species from the genus Streptomyces which has been isolated from soil from France. Streptomyces ambofaciens produces ambobactin, foromacidin A, foromacidin B, foromacidin C, 18-deoxospiramicin I, 17-methylenespiramycin I and congocidin.

See also 
 List of Streptomyces species

References

Further reading

External links
Type strain of Streptomyces ambofaciens at BacDive -  the Bacterial Diversity Metadatabase

ambofaciens
Bacteria described in 1963